Ryzhikovo is a rural locality (a village) in Kisnemskoye Rural Settlement, Vashkinsky District, Vologda Oblast, Russia. The population was 2 as of 2002.

Geography 
The distance to Lipin Bor is 26 km, to Troitskoye is 2 km.

References 

Rural localities in Vashkinsky District